Nikodemus Holler (born 4 May 1991 in Mühlacker) is a German cyclist, who currently rides for UCI Continental team .

In 2013, he was a stagiaire on UCI WorldTeam . In 2017, Holler won the UCI Africa Tour stage race Tour du Cameroun and finished third at La Tropicale Amissa Bongo, also a major African stage race.

Major results

2012
 2nd Road race, National Under-23 Road Championships
2015
 9th Overall Tour du Maroc
2016
 7th Overall Tour of China I
 10th Overall Rás Tailteann
1st  Mountains classification
2017
 1st  Overall Tour du Cameroun
1st Stage 2
 3rd Overall La Tropicale Amissa Bongo
 4th Overall Flèche du Sud
 6th Overall Tour of Quanzhou Bay
2018
 2nd Overall La Tropicale Amissa Bongo
 2nd Overall Tour de Singkarak
1st Stage 8
 3rd Overall Tour du Maroc
 5th Overall Tour de Hongrie
1st Stages 4 & 5
 8th Overall Rás Tailteann
2019
 10th Grand Prix Gazipaşa
2020
 1st  Overall Tour of Thailand
 1st Prologue Sibiu Cycling Tour
 2nd Overall Tour of Romania

References

External links

 Nikodemus Holler Profile at Rad-net

1991 births
Living people
German male cyclists
People from Mühlacker
Sportspeople from Karlsruhe (region)
Cyclists from Baden-Württemberg
21st-century German people